Giants is a supplement for fantasy role-playing games published by Mayfair Games in 1987.

Contents
Giants is a supplement describing 12 types of giants in detail: their homes, histories, spells, magic items, pets, and allies.  With five new types of giants: chaos, dwarven, forest, sea, and death.  It also includes rules for giants as player characters and a campaign-setting description of Clanfast, a giants' city.

Publication history
Giants was written by Bruce Humphrey, with art by Ray Rubin, and was published by Mayfair Games in 1997 as a 96-page book.

Reception

References

Fantasy role-playing game supplements
Role Aids
Role-playing game supplements introduced in 1987